Dilanka Isuru Kumara is a Sri Lankan weightlifter. He represented Sri Lanka at the 2019 World Weightlifting Championships, as well as the 2021 Asian Championships.

Kumara has qualified to compete for Sri Lanka at the 2022 Commonwealth Games in Birmingham, England. At the games, Kumara won the bronze medal in the 55 kg event.

References 

Living people
1996 births
Sri Lankan male weightlifters
Commonwealth Games bronze medallists for Sri Lanka
Weightlifters at the 2022 Commonwealth Games
Commonwealth Games medallists in weightlifting
Medallists at the 2022 Commonwealth Games